Edmund Howell  (born 1867) was a Welsh international footballer. He was part of the Wales national football team between 1888 and 1891, playing 3 matches and scoring 3 goals. He played his first match on 3 March 1888 against Ireland and his last match on 7 March 1891 against England.

See also
 List of Wales international footballers (alphabetical)

References

1867 births
Welsh footballers
Wales international footballers
Place of birth missing
Date of death missing
Association footballers not categorized by position